George Burnham (December 28, 1868 – June 28, 1939) was a banker and Republican politician from San Diego, California. He served two terms in the United States House of Representatives from 1933 to 1937.

Biography
Burnham was born 1868 in London, England, to James and Maria Ann Burnham.
He immigrated in 1881 to the United States with his parents, who settled in Spring Valley, Minnesota.
He attended public schools in London and Minnesota.
Burnham worked as a clerk 1884–1886, then moved to Jackson, Minnesota, in 1887 where he entered the retail shoe business.
In 1901 he moved to Spokane, Washington, and worked in real estate and ranching.

Burnham moved to San Diego in 1903 and continued to work in real estate with his brother John, until 1917 when he took up banking.
Burnham was active in public affairs.

Burnham was one of the organizers of the Panama-California Exposition in 1909, serving as vice president from 1909 to 1916.

He was also member of the Honorary Commercial Commission to China in 1910, member of the San Diego Library Commission 1926–1932, a member of the San Diego Scientific Library 1926–1932, and vice president of the California-Pacific International Exposition 1935–1936.

Burnham married Neva May Ashley on October 1, 1890, and they had six children, Harold, Percy, Helen, Laurence, Virginia, and Ben. After she died, he married Florence Kennett Dupee.

Burnham was elected to the 73rd Congress in 1932, and reelected in 1934, serving as Representative for Imperial and San Diego counties.
He worked to expand Navy presence in San Diego.
In 1936, he drew up bills to add 365,000 acres (1460 km²) of federal land in the Carrizo and Vallecito areas to the newly created Anza-Borrego Desert State Park. In 1936 he did not run again and retired in San Diego, where he lived until his death in 1939.
Burnham is interred in the Greenwood Cathedral Mausoleum, in Greenwood Memorial Park.

Further reading
  Biography, pp. 221–222; includes portrait.

External links
 Biography (San Diego Historical Society). Based on biography in Heilbron (above)
  (U.S. Congress)

1868 births
1939 deaths
Businesspeople from San Diego
Politicians from San Diego
Republican Party members of the United States House of Representatives from California
English emigrants to the United States
Burials at Greenwood Memorial Park (San Diego)
People from Spring Valley, Minnesota
People from Jackson, Minnesota
People from Spokane, Washington